Anthurium oxycarpum is a species of flowering plant in the genus Anthurium. It can be found in Central and South America from southeast Colombia to Bolivia and northern Brazil. One of the "birds nest" Anthurium species, it grows terrestrially. In its native land, the dried leaves–which smell fragrantly like vanilla and musk when dried–are sometimes smoked or used as snuff.

References

oxycarpum
Plants described in 1845